The Portuguese Securities Market Commission, also known by its initials as "CMVM", was incepted via Decree-Law No. 142-A/91, of 10 April, and established on 10 May 1991 following 30 days after its publication. It supervises and regulates securities and other financial instruments and activities of all those who operate within said markets. It is also CMVM’s mission to:

 Sanction infractions to the Securities Code and other national legislation;
 Ensure the stability of the financial markets, by contributing to identify and prevent systemic risk;
 Contribute to the development of financial instruments markets; 
 Provide information and handle complaints of non-qualified investors; 
 Mediate conflicts between entities that are subject to its supervision and between said and individual investors;
 Assist the Government and the Finance Minister; 
 Perform any other tasks that may be assigned by law.

The CMVM is an independent public institution endowed with administrative and financial autonomy. It derives its income from supervision fees charged for services and not the General State Budget.

CMVM structure:

 Management Board
 Supervisory Board; 
 Advisory Board; 
 Ethics Committee

The CMVM integrates the European System of Financial Supervision and the National Council of Financial Supervisors.

External links
Official website

Business in Portugal
Securities and exchange commissions
1991 establishments in Portugal
Financial regulatory authorities of Portugal